Pomianów Dolny  is a village in the administrative district of Gmina Ziębice, within Ząbkowice Śląskie County, Lower Silesian Voivodeship, in south-western Poland.

References

Villages in Ząbkowice Śląskie County